Ghayebi Dighi Mosque,, was an ancient mosque located in the Barothakuri Union, Zakiganj Upazila in Sylhet District. It is an important site managed by the Department of Archaeology in Bangladesh. A 400-year-old stone inscription was discovered here and is now in display at the Bangladesh National Museum. The stone inscription suggests it was built in the 17th century.

See also
 List of archaeological sites in Bangladesh

References 

Buildings and structures in Sylhet District
Architecture in Bangladesh
17th-century mosques
Pages with unreviewed translations
Historic sites in Bangladesh
Mosques in Bangladesh
Archaeological sites in Sylhet district